Djurgårdens IF Ishockeyförening – commonly known as Djurgårdens IF, Djurgården Hockey, Djurgården – is a professional ice hockey team based in Stockholm, Sweden, affiliated with the Djurgårdens IF umbrella organization. Djurgården is currently playing in the Swedish second tier ice hockey league, the HockeyAllsvenskan. Djurgården is the most successful Swedish hockey team of all time, as 16-time Swedish champions, 12-time runners-up, and leaders of the marathon table for the top flight of Swedish hockey. The ice hockey section was first established in 1922 and has since been playing in the Swedish league system, with the exception of four years in the 1930s when the hockey section was temporarily dissolved.

Djurgården primarily play their home games at Hovet, an older arena built in the 1950s with a capacity of 8,094, but high-profile matches such as derbies against AIK and playoff games may be played in Avicii Arena with its larger capacity of 13,850.

Djurgården have retired nine players' jerseys in their history, and have retired the number 2 twice, since both Roland Stoltz and Charles Berglund had worn the number before retiring jerseys became well-established in Sweden. The most common nicknames for the team are "Järnkaminerna" (The Iron Stoves), "Stockholms stolthet" (The Pride of Stockholm) and "Mesta mästarna" (The Winners of Most Championships). Djurgården also has a supporters' club called Järnkaminerna, which it shares with the football section.

History
Djurgårdens IF was founded 12 March 1891 at a café at the address of Alberget 4A on the island Djurgården. Ice hockey was introduced in Sweden in 1921, and the club's hockey section was founded in 1922 with the help of IK Göta player Wilhelm Arwe. The club participated in its first Swedish championship the same year, being beaten by Hammarby in the semifinals. The club's roster consisted of only six players but was reinforced with five new players for the following season. Djurgården managed to reach the final during this season against IK Göta, which proved to be too hard and Djurgården lost 3–0 at Stockholms Stadion. The procedure was repeated in 1924 and Djurgården had to wait until 1926 to finally lift the Le Mat trophy for the first time, after a 7–1 victory against VIK Västerås HK. The club was successful early on and four Djurgården players were named for the Swedish roster in the 1924 Winter Olympics. At the 1926 Swedish Championship, the team contained three of those players, Wilhelm Arwe, Ernst Karlberg and Ruben Allinger.

In the beginning of the 1930s, the success Djurgården had during the 1920s began to fade. High costs and low attendance figures took their toll on the hockey section, and the main club itself. At the same time, no new leaders or players joined Djurgården. When the team was relegated to the second division in 1934, the hockey section was dissolved. Instead, focus was moved to the bandy section and given the hockey section's resources.

The section was restarted in 1938 in the sixth division (Klass VI) and the team consisted of former players like Einar "Stor-Klas" Svensson and Gustaf "Lulle" Johansson. The team only played three league games during this season; but this was enough to win the sixth division and get the team promoted to the fifth division. Problems arose when the club tried to recruit new players. Those who were asked to join the team thought the inquiry was some kind of joke. However, the club managed to gather enough players to take part in the following season's matches. These players had mainly played bandy and football prior to joining the hockey team. The plan for the coming seasons was to get promoted every year until the club reached the highest division again. Thus the 1940s consisted mainly of climbing in the league system.

For three years in a row from the fifth division, Skuru IK was always ahead of Djurgården in the league table. However, as two teams were promoted from every division, this was of no concern. The 1942–43 season was never completed due to warm weather, but since the national division 2 were expanded to six leagues for the 1943–44 season, both Djurgården and Skuru were promoted anyway. This meant that Djurgården now had left the local Stockholm leagues and advanced to the national leagues. Djurgården would have to wait until 1947 to finally win a division again, only to be beaten by Atlas Diesel and Västerås SK in the promotion playoffs. For the 1948–49 season, the team was finally back in the highest league, and finished second behind Hammarby. No Swedish championship was played this season due to warm weather, and the only available hockey rink at Stockholms Stadion could not suffice. The hockey section had now trained their own talents, who began to replace many of the players still playing for either the bandy or the football section.

The 1950s began well for Djurgården. While the team couldn't beat Hammarby in the league, the Swedish Championship was a different matter. After winning on walkover against Forshaga IF, the team advanced to the semifinals to meet Hammarby. The dominants of the 1930s and the 1940s were beaten 3–1 after one goal each by twins Hans and Stig Andersson, and one goal by Karl-Erik Andersson. Djurgården's final opponent Mora IK proved to be an easy task. Gösta "Lill-Lulle" Johansson scored three goals and in the end, Mora was beaten 7–2. This was the first Swedish Championship for the club in 24 years.

The Swedish championship was remade for the 1952–53 season. Instead of a single-elimination tournament with a total of eight teams, the winners of the south and north divisions met each other twice to decide the championship. Djurgården's opponent in the final were Gävle Godtemplares IK; the first game ended with a 5–1 victory, and the second game ended with a 1–1 draw. Led by Sven "Tumba" Johansson's 19-goal season, Djurgården went on to win the south division by winning all ten league games in the 1954–55 season. Both finals in 1955 were played at Johanneshovs IP and Djurgården won both games against Hammarby IF, 6–3 in the first and 11–2 in the second final. The second final is still a record for the number of goals scored in a Swedish championship final.

Djurgården suffered from economical problems after the 2004–05 Elitserien season and lost 16 players before the following season. The club had to rely players from the junior teams and could only acquire new players who were rejected by other clubs due to the poor economy. The club's goal for the season was to stay clear of the relegation positions in the league table, which was accomplished. However, for the first time in 20 years, Djurgården was left outside the playoffs.
For the 2007–08 season, they changed their official home ice from the Stockholm Globe Arena to their smaller, former home arena, Hovet. Nevertheless, a significant minority of the games was scheduled for the larger arena, just like some games were played on Hovet during the Globe era. Djurgården reached the playoffs, finishing seventh in the regular season. The runner-up of the regular season, Linköpings HC, chose Djurgården and knocked them out of the playoffs, 4–1 in games. During the 2008–09 season all games were played at Hovet. Djurgården was often close to the relegation spots. Five straight wins after new year put Djurgården on safe ground. Although as the teams on the last playoff-spots kept winning, the team ended up on 10th position in the league table.

The 2009–10 season began with the Nordic Trophy pre-season tournament, which Djurgården won. Djurgården finished second in the league and lost the finals to HV71, Djurgården won the first final 4–3 but lost 4–2 in matches. Five of six finals went to overtime. This was the first finals for Djurgården since the 2001 playoffs.

After struggling through the 2011–12 season, Djurgården finished eleventh and had to play in the 2012 Kvalserien. Subsequently, the team was relegated to the second-tier league HockeyAllsvenskan for the 2012–13 season after failing to make the top two spots in the Kvalserien. This ended a 35-year run of consecutive Elitserien seasons for Djurgården. As a result, Djurgården fired general manager Jan Järlefelt and replaced him by Charles Berglund. Big budget cuts were also made, the player salary budget was cut in half. Djurgården set the goal to return to Elitserien immediately the following season. The team reached fifth place in the regular season, and Djurgården had to play qualification games for the 2013 Kvalserien. However, Djurgården failed to reach the final spot and the season was over.

The team was renewed for the 2013–14 season, with veteran players Kristofer Ottosson, Jimmie Ölvestad, Fredrik Bremberg and Christian Eklund retiring. Despite a rough period in November with six straight losses, Djurgården finished the regular season on third place in the league table, which guaranteed a spot in the 2014 Kvalserien. The fight for second place after already qualified Örebro was close, and had to be decided in the last round of Kvalserien. Djurgården managed to grab the spot with 17 points, the same number as Rögle but with better goal difference due to a 6–2 win against VIK Västerås HK in the final game of the season. Djurgården was once again a team of Sweden's top tier league.

The Swedish Hockey League board stirred up a controversy with the decision to redistribute 6 million SEK of TV sponsorship from Djurgården to newly relegated rival club AIK IF in May 2014. AIK received the money to ease the transition from SHL to HockeyAllsvenskan. This was widely criticised by Djurgården, fans and clubs in HockeyAllsvenskan.

Season-by-season results
This is a partial list of the last five seasons completed by Djurgården. For the full season-by-season history, see List of Djurgårdens IF Hockey seasons. Code explanation; GP—Games played, W—Wins, L—Losses, T—Tied games, GF—Goals for, GA—Goals against, Pts—Points. Top Scorer: Points (Goals+Assists)

Players and personnel

Current roster

Updated 6 March 2023

Team captains

 Leif Svensson, 1975–1976
 Stig Larsson, 1976–1979
 Mats Waltin, 1979–1982
 Håkan Eriksson, 1982–1984
 Håkan Södergren, 1984–1986
 Karl-Erik Lilja, 1986–1988
 Thomas Eriksson, 1988–1993
 Charles Berglund, 1993–1995
 Jens Öhling, 1995–1996
 Patric Kjellberg, 1996–1998
 Nichlas Falk, 1998–1999
 Charles Berglund, 1999–2001
 Nichlas Falk, 2001–2003
 Mikael Johansson, 2003–2005
 Kristofer Ottosson, 2005
 Jimmie Ölvestad, 2005–2009
 Marcus Ragnarsson, 2009–2010
 Nichlas Falk, 2010–2011
 Marcus Nilson, 2011–2012
 Timmy Pettersson, 2012–2014 
 Joakim Eriksson, 2014–2015
 Henrik Eriksson, 2015–2016
 Calle Ridderwall, 2016–2018
 Andreas Engqvist, 2018–2019
 Jacob Josefson, 2019–2021
 Linus Videll, 2021
 Marcus Sörensen, 2021–2022
 Marcus Krüger, 2022–

Head coaches

Hans Mild, 1975–1978
Eilert Määttä, 1978–1979
Bert-Ola Nordlander, 1979–1981
Leif Boork, 1981–1984
Gunnar Svensson, 1984–1986
Lars-Fredrik Nyström, 1986
Leif Boork, 1986–1987
Ingvar Carlsson, 1987–1988
Tommy Boustedt, 1988–1990
Lasse Falk, 1990–1994
Tommy Boustedt, 1994–1996
Stephan Lundh, 1996–1997
Niklas Wikegård, 1997–1998
Mats Waltin,Hardy Nilsson, 1998–2001
Kent Johansson, 2001–2002
Niklas Wikegård, 2002–2005
Hans Särkijärvi, 2005–2008
Mikael Johansson, Tomas Montén, 2008–2009
Hardy Nilsson, 2009–2012
Tony Zabel, 2012–2012
Charles Berglund, 2012–2012
Tony Zabel, 2012–2014
Hans Särkijärvi, 2014–2016
Robert Ohlsson, 2016–2021
Barry Smith, 2021
Nichlas Falk*, Mikael Aaro*, 2021–2022
Joakim Fagervall, 2022
Johan Garpenlöv, 2022–present

Honored members

2 Roland Stoltz
2 Charles Berglund
5 Sven Tumba
11 Jens Öhling
12 Lars Björn
16 Nichlas Falk
22 Håkan Södergren
25 Mikael Johansson
27 Thomas Eriksson

Summary
Djurgården has honoured a total of nine player numbers. The number 2 worn by Roland Stoltz, who spent 15 seasons with Djurgården between 1955 and 1970. As well, the number 2 worn by Charles Berglund was also retired by Djurgården, on 24 January 2012. Berglund played 12 seasons with Djurgården and won the Swedish Championship with them five times. He was the team's captain in his four final seasons before retiring in 2001. He also won the World Championship gold medal two times (1991, 1992) as well as the Olympics gold medal once (1994).

The number 5 worn by Sven "Tumba" Johansson, who spent 16 seasons with Djurgården between 1950 and 1966. The number 11 worn by Jens Öhling, who spent 18 seasons with Djurgården between 1979 and 1997. His number was retired on 24 January 2002. The number 12 worn by Lars Björn, who spent 18 seasons with Djurgården between 1949 and 1966. The number 16 worn by Nichlas Falk, who played a total of 16 seasons and 751 games with Djurgården between 1995 and 2011. Falk's number was retired on 12 October 2017. The number 22 worn by Håkan Södergren, who played 14 seasons with Djurgården between 1977 and 1991. The number 25 worn by Mikael Johansson, who joined the club in 1985. Johansson played seven seasons before joining EHC Kloten in the Swiss National League A. He returned to Djurgården in 1997 and played eight more seasons in the club. Johansson's number was retired on 15 February 2007. The number 27 worn by Thomas Eriksson, who joined Djurgården in 1976 and played four seasons before joining Philadelphia Flyers. He returned in 1981 and played two seasons before moving back to Philadelphia once more. In 1986, Eriksson returned to Djurgården and played an additional eight seasons.

Four Djurgården players and two builders has been inducted into the IIHF Hall of Fame. Arne Grunander, longtime chairman of the club, was inducted in 1997. Grunander was also the chairman of Swedish Ice Hockey Association between 1978 and 1983. Arne Strömberg, head coach of the team between 1956 and 1960, and head coach of team Sweden between 1960 and 1971. Forward Sven "Tumba" Johansson was inducted the same year, and represented team Sweden in four Olympic Games and 14 IIHF World Championships. He played a total of 245 games and scored 186 goals for the national team, which makes him team Sweden's scoring leader of all time. Defenceman Lars Björn was inducted in 1998, representing Sweden in three Olympic Games and 9 World Championships. He played a total of 217 games for the national team. Defenceman Roland Stoltz was inducted in 1999, representing team Sweden in three Olympic Games and 12 World Championships. He played a total of 218 games for the national team. Forward Kent Nilsson was inducted in 2006. He joined Djurgården in 1973 and played for the team during three seasons. After 11 seasons in North America and a short stint in Italy and Switzerland, Nilsson returned to Djurgården for one season in 1988, winning the Swedish championship. He had another stint in Switzerland before playing his last and fifth season in Djurgården in 1992. Nilsson represented team Sweden in 94 games.

Franchise records and leaders

Scoring leaders
These are the top-ten point-scorers of Djurgårdens IF since the 1975–76 season, which is the first Elitserien season. Figures are updated after each completed season.

Note: Pos = Position; GP = Games played; G = Goals; A = Assists; Pts = Points; P/G = Points per game;  = current Djurgårdens IF player

Trophies and awards

Team
Le Mat Trophy (16): 1926, 1950, 1954, 1955, 1958, 1959, 1960, 1961, 1962, 1963, 1983, 1989, 1990, 1991, 2000, 2001
European Cup (2): 1991, 1992
European trophy (1): 2009
Tampere cup (2): 1990, 2000

Individual

Coach of the Year
 Hardy Nilsson: 1999–00, 2009–10

Guldhjälmen
 Tommy Söderström: 1997–98
 Fredrik Bremberg: 2006–07
 Jacob Josefson: 2018–19

Guldpucken
 Roland Stoltz: 1958–59
 Anders Kallur: 1978–79
 Håkan Södergren: 1986–87
 Kent Nilsson: 1988–89
 Rolf Ridderwall: 1989–90
 Mikael Johansson: 1999–00
Håkan Loob Trophy
 Patric Kjellberg: 1997–98
 Emil Bemström: 2018–19

Honken Trophy
 Daniel Larsson: 2007–08
 Adam Reideborn: 2018–19

Rinkens riddare
 Sven "Tumba" Johansson: 1963–64
 Roland Stoltz: 1965–66
 Stig Larsson: 1977–78
 Patric Kjellberg: 1997–98
 Mikael Johansson: 2000–01
 Fredrik Bremberg: 2005–06

Rookie of the Year
 Tommy Söderström: 1990–91
 Per Eklund: 1994–95
 Mikael Tellqvist: 1999–00
 Patric Hörnqvist: 2006–07
 Daniel Larsson: 2007–08
 Marcus Sörensen: 2014–15
 Emil Bemström: 2018–19
 William Eklund: 2020–21

Swedish junior player of the year
 Niklas Kronwall: 2000–01
 Emil Bemström: 2018–19
 William Eklund: 2020–21

References

Footnotes

External links

Official site
Official supporter site

 
HockeyAllsvenskan teams
1922 establishments in Sweden
Ice hockey
Djurgardens IF
Djurgardens IF
Ice hockey clubs established in 1922
Ice hockey teams in Stockholm County
Ice hockey teams in Stockholm